Dawsonville may refer to:

Places
In the United States
 Dawsonville, Georgia
 Dawsonville, Maryland
 Dawsonville, Missouri
 Dawsonville, Virginia

Elsewhere
 Dawsonville, Kenya
 Dawsonville, New Brunswick